Symonanthus aromaticus is a species of flowering plant in the potato family that is endemic to Australia.

Description
The species grows as an erect shrub to 30–130 cm in height. The white flowers appear from August to November.

Distribution and habitat
The species is found on sandy soils in the Coolgardie and Mallee IBRA bioregions of south-west Western Australia.

References

aromaticus
Eudicots of Western Australia
Solanales of Australia
Taxa named by Charles Gardner
Plants described in 1939